Hans-Joachim "Jochen" Reske (born 9 April 1940) is a West German former track and field athlete, who mainly competed in the 400 metres. He won a silver medal at the 1960 Summer Olympics, and in 1962, at the European championships, he finished in third place in the individual 400 m and his team won the 4×400 metre relay.

References

1940 births
Living people
People from Bartoszyce
People from East Prussia
Sportspeople from Warmian-Masurian Voivodeship
German male sprinters
West German male sprinters
Olympic male sprinters
Olympic athletes of the United Team of Germany
Olympic silver medalists in athletics (track and field)
Olympic silver medalists for the United Team of Germany
Athletes (track and field) at the 1960 Summer Olympics
Medalists at the 1960 Summer Olympics
Universiade medalists in athletics (track and field)
Universiade silver medalists for West Germany
European Athletics Championships medalists
Japan Championships in Athletics winners